Scott Alan Smith (born November 8, 1961) is an American character actor and academic who is known for his roles in film, television and theatre.

Background 
Smith was born in New York City in 1961. He earned a Bachelor of Arts degree in English from George Mason University and a Master of Fine Arts from the American Conservatory Theater. In addition to his acting roles, Smith has also been a visiting professor of theatre at Pepperdine University and the Savannah College of Art and Design.

Filmography

Film

Television

References 

1961 births
Living people
Male actors from New York City
George Mason University alumni
American Conservatory Theater alumni
Pepperdine University faculty
Savannah College of Art and Design faculty